Pamela Katherine Healy (born June 24, 1963 in San Francisco, California) is a retired female sailor from the United States, who won a bronze medal at the 1992 Summer Olympics in Barcelona, Spain. She did so in the 470 class, alongside Jennifer Isler.

Pam grew up sailing in the SF Bay Area. Her parents, John and Mary Poletti, sailed in the large (at the time) Cal-20 fleet. Pam learned to sail in her yellow El Toro named "Woodstock" with the likes of John Kostecki at the Richmond Yacht Club where she met her husband Craig Healy. Pam joined the St. Francis Yacht Club as a Junior Member in 1983.

Pam resides in Marin County with her husband, Craig, and their three children.

References

External links
 
 
 

1963 births
Living people
American female sailors (sport)
Sailors at the 1992 Summer Olympics – 470
Olympic bronze medalists for the United States in sailing
Sportspeople from San Francisco
470 class world champions
Medalists at the 1992 Summer Olympics
World champions in sailing for the United States
21st-century American women